Eugenie Bouchard and Grace Min were the defending champions but Min was no longer eligible to compete as a junior.

Bouchard and Taylor Townsend defeated Belinda Bencic and Ana Konjuh in the final, 6–4, 6–3 to win the girls' doubles tennis title at the 2012 Wimbledon Championships.

Seeds

  Eugenie Bouchard /  Taylor Townsend (champions)
  Daria Gavrilova /  Elina Svitolina (semifinals)
  María Inés Deheza /  Elizaveta Kulichkova (second round)
  Françoise Abanda /  Sachia Vickery (semifinals)
  Indy de Vroome /  Anett Kontaveit (quarterfinals)
  Anna Danilina /  Beatriz Haddad Maia (quarterfinals)
  Belinda Bencic /  Ana Konjuh (final)
  Montserrat González /  Chalena Scholl (second round)

Draw

Finals

Top half

Bottom half

References

External links

Girls' Doubles
Wimbledon Championship by year – Girls' doubles